Mahesh Bhupathi and Leander Paes defeated the defending champion Paul Haarhuis and his partner Jared Palmer in the final, 6–7(10–12), 6–3, 6–4, 7–6(7–4), to win the gentlemen's doubles title at the 1999 Wimbledon Championships.

Jacco Eltingh and Haarhuis were the reigning champions, but Eltingh did not compete.

Seeds

  Mahesh Bhupathi /  Leander Paes (champions)
  Todd Woodbridge /  Mark Woodforde (quarterfinals)
  Jonas Björkman /  Pat Rafter (quarterfinals, retired)
  Wayne Black /  Sandon Stolle (quarterfinals)
  Olivier Delaître /  Fabrice Santoro (semifinals)
  Mark Knowles /  Daniel Nestor (semifinals)
  Ellis Ferreira /  Rick Leach (second round)
  Paul Haarhuis /  Jared Palmer (final)
  Sébastien Lareau /  Alex O'Brien (quarterfinals)
  David Adams /  John-Laffnie de Jager (third round)
  Martin Damm /  Cyril Suk (first round)
  Wayne Arthurs /  Andrew Kratzmann (second round)
  Nicklas Kulti /  Mikael Tillström (first round)
  David Prinosil /  Daniel Vacek (first round)
  Piet Norval /  Kevin Ullyett (third round)
  Patrick Galbraith /  Justin Gimelstob (third round)

Qualifying

Draw

Finals

Top half

Section 1

Section 2

Bottom half

Section 3

Section 4

References

External links

1999 Wimbledon Championships – Men's draws and results at the International Tennis Federation

Men's Doubles
Wimbledon Championship by year – Men's doubles